Oedothorax is a genus of dwarf spiders that was first described by A. Förster & Philipp Bertkau in 1883.

Species
 it contains thirty-eight species and one subspecies:
O. agrestis (Blackwall, 1853) – Europe, Russia (Europe to South Siberia)
Oedothorax a. longipes (Simon, 1884) – Switzerland
O. annulatus Wunderlich, 1974 – Nepal
O. apicatus (Blackwall, 1850) – Europe, Turkey, Caucasus, Russia (Europe to South Siberia), Kazakhstan, Iran, Central Asia, China
O. banksi Strand, 1906 – USA (Alaska)
O. biantu Zhao & Li, 2014 – China
O. bifoveatus Tanasevitch, 2017 – Malaysia (Borneo), Indonesia (Java)
O. cascadeus Chamberlin, 1949 – USA
O. cheruthoniensis Domichan & Sunil Jose, 2021 – India
O. collinus Ma & Zhu, 1991 – China
O. cruciferoides Tanasevitch, 2020 – Nepal
O. cunur Tanasevitch, 2015 – India
O. dubius Caporiacco, 1935 – India (Karakorum)
O. fuscus (Blackwall, 1834) – Azores, Europe, North Africa
O. gibbifer (Kulczyński, 1882) – Europe
O. gibbosus (Blackwall, 1841) (type) – Europe, Turkey, Russia (Europe to South Siberia)
O. howardi Petrunkevitch, 1925 – USA
O. japonicus Kishida, 1910 – Japan
O. khasi Tanasevitch, 2017 – India
O. kodaikanal Tanasevitch, 2015 – India
O. limatus Crosby, 1905 – USA
O. mangsima Tanasevitch, 2020 – Nepal
O. meghalaya Tanasevitch, 2015 – India
O. meridionalis Tanasevitch, 1987 – Caucasus, Russia (Caucasus, Central Asia), Iran, Central Asia
O. myanmar Tanasevitch, 2017 – Myanmar
O. nazareti Scharff, 1989 – Ethiopia
O. paludigena Simon, 1926 – Spain, France (incl. Corsica), Italy (incl. Sardinia), Albania, Greece
O. paracymbialis Tanasevitch, 2015 – India
O. retusus (Westring, 1851) – Europe, Turkey, Caucasus, Russia (Europe to north-eastern Siberia), Kazakhstan, China, India?
O. sexmaculatus Saito & Ono, 2001 – Japan
O. sohra Tanasevitch, 2020 – Nepal
O. stylus Tanasevitch, 2015 – India
O. tingitanus (Simon, 1884) – Spain, Morocco, Algeria, Tunisia
O. trilineatus Saito, 1934 – Japan
O. trilobatus (Banks, 1896) – USA, Canada, Russia (Kamchatka)
O. unciger Tanasevitch, 2020 – Nepal
O. uncus Tanasevitch, 2015 – India
O. uncus Domichan & Sunil Jose, 2021 – India

See also
 List of Linyphiidae species (I–P)

References

Araneomorphae genera
Cosmopolitan spiders
Linyphiidae
Taxa named by Philipp Bertkau